Laura Allen (born March 21, 1974) is an American actress. She starred as Lily Tyler during the first two seasons of the USA Network television series The 4400.

Personal life
Allen was born in Portland, Oregon, the daughter of Julie and David Allen. She grew up on Bainbridge Island, Washington, as the middle child of three sisters. She attended Wellesley College as a sociology major and graduated in 1996. She worked with the NYPD as a domestic violence counselor before pursuing acting.

She and Bruce Weyman married at the Relais Palazzo del Capitano in Pienza, Italy, on September 23, 2006. They have two sons.

Career
Allen first established her career portraying Laura Kirk-English DuPres on the soap opera All My Children from 2000 to 2002, taking over the role from Lauren Roman who originated the role from 1995 to 1998. After departing AMC, Allen went on to play Susan Delacorte in Mike Newell's Mona Lisa Smile. She later starred in USA Network's hit series, The 4400. She played the role of Lily Tyler. However, her character was written out of the show before its third season. She reprised the role of Lily Tyler in 2007 in the fourth season of The 4400 for one episode.

In 2006, Allen was a guest star on House M.D. in the episode "All In", as Sarah, the mother of a sick 6-year-old boy. She was also a guest star in the season 2 episode of Criminal Minds "Open Season" as the victim of two serial killers and in the 2007 season premiere of Law & Order: SVU. She starred as Julia Mallory in the first season of the FX drama series Dirt. Her character was a Hollywood heroin addict. She also appeared as a former love interest of Owen Hunt on the ABC's Grey's Anatomy in 2009. Other recent projects include the thrillers Hysteria, From Within, The Collective, and Old Dogs. She has played regular characters in two television series: Katie Nichols in Terriers in 2010 and Hannah Britten in Awake in 2012. In 2014 she portrayed Meg in the American horror film Clown. She also portrayed Linda Kessler in the drama thriller film Nanny Cam.

In May 2016, Allen guest starred in the thirteenth episode of the first season of Criminal Minds: Beyond Borders, titled "Paper Orphans". She played Emily Wagner, the mother of a young girl who was kidnapped in Haiti.

Filmography

Film

Television

References

External links
 

1974 births
American soap opera actresses
American television actresses
21st-century American actresses
Living people
Actresses from Portland, Oregon
Actresses from Washington (state)
Wellesley College alumni
American film actresses